Kamari Quincey Lassiter (born January 23, 2003) is an American football defensive back for the Georgia Bulldogs.

Early life and high school career 
Lassiter was born in Savannah, Georgia on January 23, 2003. At the age of three, he began to play football. Lassiter attended American Christian Academy in Tuscaloosa, Alabama. He was a multi-sport athlete, playing football, basketball, baseball, and running track. During his high school career, Lassiter recorded 210 tackles, ten interceptions, and four forced fumbles. In addition, Lassiter played wide receiver totaling 2,488 yards, and 35 touchdowns. A four-star recruit, Lassiter committed to play college football at the University of Georgia over the likes of Auburn, Clemson, and Georgia Tech.

College career 
As a true freshman in 2021, Lassiter played in all 15 games, in which he tallied 11 tackles and one interception. Entering the 2022 season, Lassiter's role was expected to increase with the departure of Derion Kendrick. In the season opener vs Oregon, Lassiter made his first career start totaling three tackles. Against Tennessee, Lassiter recorded a career-high five tackles and a pass break up.

References

External links 

 Georgia Bulldogs bio

Living people
2003 births
Georgia Bulldogs football players
Players of American football from Savannah, Georgia
American football defensive backs
African-American players of American football